The 2014 NCAA Division I women's basketball tournament was played in March and April 2014, with the Final Four played April 6–8.  The Ohio Valley Conference served as the host institution. The Final Four was played at Bridgestone Arena in Nashville, Tennessee.

Tennessee continued its streak of making every NCAA women's basketball tournament at 33 consecutive appearances.  Connecticut (who made their seventh consecutive Final Four overall) and Notre Dame faced each other in the NCAA Final.  Both were undefeated heading into the championship game, making it the first ever match up of two undefeated teams in the championship game. Connecticut prevailed, 79–58, to win their ninth national championship.

The previous day, Connecticut also won the men's tournament.  It was just the second time in NCAA history the same school had won both the men's and women's tournament; UConn first accomplished that feat in 2004.

Tournament procedure

	
Pending any changes to the format, a total of 64 teams will enter the 2014 tournament. 32 automatic bids shall be awarded to each program that wins their conference's tournament. The remaining 36 bids are "at-large", with selections extended by the NCAA Selection Committee. The tournament is split into four regional tournaments, and each regional has teams seeded from 1 to 16, with the committee ostensibly making every region as comparable to the others as possible. The top-seeded team in each region plays the #16 team, the #2 team plays the #15, etc. (meaning where the two seeds add up to 17, that team will be assigned to play another).

The basis for the subregionals returned to the approach used between 1982 and 2002; the top sixteen teams, as chosen in the bracket selection process, hosted the first two rounds on campus.

The Selection Committee will also seed the entire field from 1 to 64.

2014 NCAA Tournament schedule and venues 
There were 64 teams in the tournament, placed in a seeded bracket with four regions.  Thirty-two teams received automatic bids – thirty-one of which were their conference tournament champions; the other was for the Ivy League regular-season champion.  An additional 32 teams were given at-large bids by the selection committee on the basis of their body of work during the regular season.  Unlike the Men's Tournament, there was no "First Four" round.

First and Second rounds (Subregionals)

The subregionals were played from March 22 to March 25, 2014. Sites chosen to host first- and second-round games in 2014 were:

 March 22 and 24
 Hilton Coliseum, Ames, Iowa (Host: Iowa State)
 Cameron Indoor Stadium, Durham, North Carolina (Host: Duke)
 Thompson–Boling Arena, Knoxville, Tennessee (Host: Tennessee)
 Memorial Coliseum, Lexington, Kentucky (Host: Kentucky)
 Pauley Pavilion, Los Angeles (Host: UCLA)
 Savage Arena, Toledo, Ohio (Host: Toledo)
 Ferrell Center, Waco, Texas (Host: Baylor)
 Mackey Arena, West Lafayette, Indiana (Host: Purdue)
 March 23 and 25
 Pete Maravich Assembly Center, Baton Rouge, Louisiana (Host: LSU)
 Carmichael Arena, Chapel Hill, North Carolina (Host: North Carolina)
 Comcast Center, College Park, Maryland (Host: Maryland)
 Reed Arena, College Station, Texas (Host: Texas A&M)
 Carver–Hawkeye Arena, Iowa City, Iowa (Host: Iowa)
 Alaska Airlines Arena, Seattle (Host: Washington)
 Harry A. Gampel Pavilion, Storrs, Connecticut (Host: Connecticut)
 Bryce Jordan Center, University Park, Pennsylvania (Host: Penn State)

Regional semifinals and finals (Sweet Sixteen and Elite Eight)

The Regionals, named for the city rather than the region of geographic importance since 2005, were held from March 29 to April 1 at the following sites:
 March 29 and 31
 Lincoln Regional, Pinnacle Bank Arena, Lincoln, Nebraska (Host: Nebraska)
 South Bend Regional, Joyce Center, Notre Dame, Indiana (Host: Notre Dame)
 March 30 and April 1
 Louisville Regional, KFC Yum! Center, Louisville, Kentucky (Host: Louisville)
 Stanford Regional, Maples Pavilion, Stanford, California (Host: Stanford)

National semifinals and championship (Final Four and national championship)

April 6 & 8
Bridgestone Arena, Nashville, Tennessee (Hosts: Southeastern Conference/Ohio Valley Conference and Belmont University/Vanderbilt University)

It was the first time that Nashville had hosted a Women's Final Four Basketball tournament.

Tournament records 
 Team rebound margin—Notre Dame out rebounded Maryland 50 to 21; the margin of 29 is the largest margin in Final Four history
 Assists—Connecticut recorded 25 assists in the Championship game against Notre Dame, the most ever recorded in a Final Four game since the NCAA began recording assists in 1985.
 Oklahoma scored 66 points in the second half of a first-round game against DePaul, the most points scored in a half of an NCAA tournament game, but lost to DePaul 104–100.

Automatic qualifiers

The following teams earned automatic qualifiers for the 2014 NCAA field by virtue of winning their conference's tournament (except for the Ivy League, whose regular-season champion receives the automatic bid):

Tournament seeds

Bracket
* – Denotes overtime period

Lincoln Regional 
In their first round match DePaul and Oklahoma scored a combined 204 points, setting a tournament record for most points in a non-overtime game.  Oklahoma's 66 second-half points was also a record a team in a single half.

Connecticut vs. Prairie View A&M aired nationwide on ESPN. Connecticut vs. Saint Joseph's aired nationwide on ESPNU. All other games aired with whip-a-round or regional coverage on ESPN or ESPN2.

Notre Dame Regional 
Notre Dame vs. Robert Morris aired nationwide on ESPN. Notre Dame vs. Arizona State aired nationwide on ESPNews. All other games aired with whip-a-round or regional coverage on ESPN or ESPN2.

Louisville Regional

Stanford Regional

Final Four – Nashville, Tennessee

Final Four summaries

National championship

Undefeated Connecticut faced undefeated Notre Dame in the final game, the first ever to feature two undefeated teams.  After a hard-fought first half, the Connecticut Huskies pulled away in the second for a 79–58 victory.  National Player of the Year Breanna Stewart scored 21 points for Connecticut. Stefanie Dolson added 17 points and 16 rebounds for the victors.  Kayla McBride had 21 points for the Notre Dame Irish.  Connecticut won the rebound battle 54–31 and held Notre Dame to a season low in points.  After the game, Notre Dame coach Muffet McGraw said "I thought we were playing the Miami Heat for a while [Connecticut is] just that good."

By winning, Connecticut moved to 40–0 on the season and claimed their ninth title, surpassing Tennessee's eight titles for the most all-time.  Coach Geno Auriemma said he was "flattered and grateful and all the things that come with this kind of accomplishment ... I'm more proud of the legacy that exists and what Connecticut basketball is as opposed to the number of championships."  All nine of the school's titles, five with unbeaten records, have come during Auriemma's twenty seasons as head coach.  Connecticut became the second school to finish the year 40–0, the other being Baylor.  They have now won 46 consecutive games, the third most in NCAA history, but well short of their NCAA record of 90.

For Notre Dame, it was their third loss in the title game in the last four years.  They were inhibited by the loss of senior starter Natalie Achonwa to injury in the Regional Final.  The Irish  had won seven of the previous nine meeting between the two powerhouses. However, Connecticut beat them during the tournament for the second consecutive year, having eliminated them in the Final Four in 2013.

All-Tournament team 
 Breanna Stewart, Connecticut
 Kaleena Mosqueda-Lewis, Connecticut
 Stefanie Dolson, Connecticut
 Kayla McBride, Notre Dame
 Jewell Loyd, Notre Dame

Game Officials 
 Chuck Gonzalez (semifinal)
 Cameron Inouye (semifinal)
 Tina Napier (semifinal)
 Mike Price (semifinal)
 Joe Vaszily (semifinal)
 Scott Yarbrough (semifinal)
 Denise Brooks (final)
 Dee Kanter (final)
 Joe Vasily (Standby) 
 Lisa Mattingly (final)

Record by conference 
Source

 The R64, R32, S16, E8, F4, CG, and NC columns indicate how many teams from each conference were in the round of 64 (first round), round of 32 (second round), Sweet 16, Elite Eight, Final Four, championship game, and national champion, respectively.
 The America East, Atlantic Sun, Big Sky, Big South, Big West, Conference USA, Horizon, Ivy, MEAC, Metro Atlantic, Mid-American (MAC), Missouri Valley, Mountain West, Northeast, Ohio Valley, Patriot, Southern, Southland, Sun Belt, SWAC, and WAC conferences each had one representative that was eliminated in the first round.

Media coverage

Television
ESPN had US television rights to all games during the tournament. For the first and second round, ESPN aired select games nationally on ESPN, ESPNU, or ESPNews. All other games aired regionally on ESPN or ESPN2 and streamed online via ESPN3. Most of the nation got whip-a-round coverage during this time, which allowed ESPN to rotate between the games and focus the nation on the one that has the closest score. The regional semifinals were split between ESPN and ESPN2, and ESPN aired the regional finals, national semifinals, and championship match.

Studio host & analysts
Kevin Negandhi (Host)
Kara Lawson (Analyst)
Rebecca Lobo (Analyst)

Broadcast assignments

First & Second Rounds Saturday/Monday
Mark Jones & LaChina Robinson – Durham, North Carolina
Marc Kestecher & Brooke Weisbrod – Lexington, Kentucky
Beth Mowins & Stephanie White – Toledo, Ohio
Melissa Lee & Jimmy Dykes – West Lafayette, Indiana
Clay Matvick & Fran Fraschilla – Ames, Iowa
Joe Davis & Maria Taylor – Knoxville, Tennessee
Dave Pasch & Doris Burke – Los Angeles, California
Pam Ward & Carolyn Peck – Waco, Texas
Sweet Sixteen & Elite Eight Saturday/Monday
Beth Mowins, Stephanie White, & Maria Taylor – South Bend, Indiana
Pam Ward, Carolyn Peck, & LaChina Robinson – Lincoln, Nebraska
Final Four
Dave O'Brien, Doris Burke, & Holly Rowe – Nashville, Tennessee

First & Second Rounds Sunday/Tuesday
Cara Capuano & Nell Fortner – Baton Rouge, Louisiana
Tom Hart & Mary Murphy – Chapel Hill, North Carolina
Bob Wischusen & Christy Winters-Scott – College Park, Maryland
Bob Picozzi & Krista Blunk – University Park, Pennsylvania
Carter Blackburn & Rosalyn Gold-Onwude – College Station, Texas
Holly Rowe & Brenda VanLengen – Iowa City, Iowa
Dave Flemming & Sean Farnham – Seattle, Washington
Dave O'Brien & Debbie Antonelli – Storrs, Connecticut
Sweet Sixteen & Elite Eight Sunday/Tuesday
Dave O'Brien, Doris Burke, & Holly Rowe – Louisville, Kentucky
Dave Pasch, Debbie Antonelli, & Brooke Weisbrod – Stanford, California
Championship
Dave O'Brien, Doris Burke, & Holly Rowe – Nashville, Tennessee

Radio
Westwood One had nationwide broadcast and streaming radio rights from the regional finals on through the championship. The teams participating in the Regional Finals, Final Four, and championship were allowed to have their own local broadcasts, but were not allowed to stream their broadcast online.

Regional Finals Monday
Jason Benetti & Krista Blunk – South Bend, Indiana 
Craig Way & Brenda VanLengen – Lincoln, Nebraska
Final Four
Dave Ryan, Debbie Antonelli, & Krista Blunk – Nashville, Tennessee

Regional Finals Tuesday
Dave Ryan & Ann Schatz – Louisville, Kentucky
Brandon Gaudin & Ann Meyers Drysdale – Stanford, California
Championship
Dave Ryan, Debbie Antonelli, & Krista Blunk – Nashville, Tennessee

See also
 2014 NCAA Division I men's basketball tournament
 2014 National Invitation Tournament
 2014 Women's National Invitation Tournament

Notes

NCAA tournament
NCAA Division I women's basketball tournament
NCAA Division I women's basketball tournament
NCAA Division I women's basketball tournament
NCAA Division I women's basketball tournament
Basketball in Waco, Texas